The Complete Ella Fitzgerald & Louis Armstrong on Verve is a compilation album released on Verve Records in 1997. It comprises three compact discs containing the three studio albums made for the label by Ella Fitzgerald and Louis Armstrong, released during 1956 through 1958.

Its 47 tracks are collated from Ella and Louis, Ella and Louis Again, and Porgy and Bess. Two tracks are from an August 15, 1956 concert at the Hollywood Bowl with the duo backed by Armstrong's touring band, the All Stars. Disc one tracks one through eleven comprise Ella and Louis, while disc one tracks 12 through 16 and disc two tracks one through 14 comprise Ella and Louis Again. The Hollywood Bowl performances are on tracks 15 and 16 of disc two, and disc three contains the Porgy and Bess album. Not all tracks are vocal duets and are indicated below.

Track listing

Disc one

Disc two

Disc three

Personnel
Ella Fitzgerald — vocals
Louis Armstrong — vocals; trumpet on disc one tracks one through eleven and "Autumn in New York," "Stompin' at the Savoy," "Gee Baby Ain't I Good to You," "Willow Weep for Me," "Love Is Here to Stay," "Learnin' the Blues," "You Won't Be Satisfied," "Undecided," "Summertime," "I Got Plenty o' Nuttin'," "It Ain't Necessarily So," "A Woman Is a Sometime Thing," and "There's a Boat Dat's Leavin' Soon for New York"

Accompaniment on discs one and two
Trummy Young — trombone on  "You Won't Be Satisfied" and "Undecided"
Edmond Hall — clarinet on  "You Won't Be Satisfied" and "Undecided"
Oscar Peterson — piano on disc one and disc two tracks one through 14
Billy Kyle — piano on  "You Won't Be Satisfied" and "Undecided"
Herb Ellis — guitar on disc one and disc two tracks one through 14
Ray Brown — bass on disc one and disc two tracks one through 14
Dale Jones — bass on  "You Won't Be Satisfied" and "Undecided"
Buddy Rich — drums on disc one tracks one through eleven
Louie Bellson — drums on disc one tracks 12 through 16 and disc two tracks one through 14
Barrett Deems — drums on  "You Won't Be Satisfied" and "Undecided"

Orchestra on disc three
Russell Garcia – arranger, conductor
Victor Arno, Robert Barene, Jacques Gasselin, Joseph Livoti, Dan Lube, Amerigo Marino, Erno Neufeld, Marshall Sosson, Robert Sushel, Gerald Vinci, Tibor Zelig — violins
Myron Bacon, Abraham Hochstein, Raymond Menhennick, Myron Sandler — violas
Justin Di Tullio, Kurt Reher, William Van Den Burg — cellos
Frank Beach, Buddy Childers, Cappy Lewis — trumpets
Milt Bernhart, Marshall Cram, James Henderson, Lloyd Ulyate — trombones
Vincent DeRosa – French horn
Bill Miller, Paul Smith – piano
Tony Rizzi – guitar
Joe Mondragon – bass
Alvin Stoller – drums

Additional personnel
Norman Granz — original producer
Val Valentin — session engineer
Phil Stern — photography

References

Ella Fitzgerald albums
Louis Armstrong albums
Vocal duet albums
Albums produced by Norman Granz
1997 compilation albums
Verve Records compilation albums